G.984, commonly known as GPON (gigabit-capable passive optical network), is a standard for passive optical networks (PON) published by the ITU-T. It is commonly used to implement the outermost link to the customer (last kilometre or last mile) of fibre-to-the-premises (FTTP) services.

GPON puts requirements on the optical medium and the hardware used to access it, and defines the manner in which ethernet frames are converted to an optical signal, as well as the parameters of that signal. The bandwidth of the single connection between the OLT (optical line termination) and the ONTs (optical network terminals) is 2.4Gbit/s down, 1.2Gbit/s up, or rarely symmetric 2.4Gbit/s, shared between up to 128 ONTs using a time-division multiple access (TDMA) protocol, which the standard defines. GPON specifies protocols for error correction (Reed–Solomon) and encryption (AES), and defines a protocol for line control (OMCI) which includes authentication (LOID, Serial number and/or Password).

Though implementations of GPON share a lot of common features, many features were left undefined, thus in practice, there is little compatibility between the various implementations. Specifically, the exact kind of fibre cable and connectors to use is undefined.

The primary optical transmitter, known as the Optical Line Terminal (OLT), is housed within the central office of the telecommunications operator. A laser in the OLT injects photons from the central office into a glass-and-plastic fiber-optic cable that terminates at a passive optical splitter. The splitter divides the single signal from the central office into many signals that can be sent to up to 64 consumers. The number of consumers serviced by a single laser is determined by the operator's engineering criteria, which may opt to reduce the number to 32 consumers. Furthermore, the operator may choose to divide the signal twice, for example, once into eight and again farther down the line. The maximum distance between the central office and the site can be 20 kilometers, however operators will normally limit it to 16 kilometers in order to maintain a high level of service.

In contrast to ADSL technology, which deteriorates as the distance between the central office and the household rises, with severe signal loss beyond 3km, all houses may enjoy high-speed internet within the 16km range of a fibre central office.

The standards

The first version of GPON was ratified in 2003. Since then, it has been expanded upon and revised several times. Work on the standard continues. As of July 2018, G.984.5 is currently being revised. The most recent version comprises seven parts:

 G.984.1 : General characteristics, 2008, with amendment 1 (2009) and 2 (2012)
 G.984.2 : Physical Media Dependent (PMD) layer specification, 2003, with amendment 1 (2006) and 2 (2008)
 G.984.3 : Transmission convergence layer specification, 2008, with amendments 1 (2009), 2 (2009), 3 (2012) and erratum 1 (2010)
 G.984.4 : ONT management and control interface (OMCI) specification, 2008, with amendments 1 (2009), 2 (2009), 3 (2010), erratum 1 (2009), corrigendum 1 (2010), and an implementer's guide (2009)
 G.984.5 : Enhancement Band, 2014, Coexistence with future WDM PON technology on the same medium
 G.984.6 : Reach extension (2008), with amendments 1 (2009) and 2 (2012)
 G.984.7 : Long reach (2010)

The GPON OMCI recommendation G.984.4 draws on G.983.2, which defines the BPON management model. However, G.984.4 removed all references to ATM. G.988 is a stand-alone OMCI recommendation and supersedes G.984.4 except for GPON specifics that are not defined in G.988. Future work on the PON management model is expected to appear only in the GPON space.

See also
 Passive optical network
 10G-PON
 NG-PON2

References

ITU-T recommendations
ITU-T G Series Recommendations
Telecommunication protocols